The Women's Australian Open is a women's professional golf tournament played in Australia, operated by Golf Australia and the WPGA Tour of Australasia, long co-sanctioned by the Ladies European Tour (LET). Beginning with the 2012 event, it is also co-sanctioned by the U.S.-based LPGA Tour. In 2008, it was the second-richest women's golf tournament on the ALPG Tour, with a prize fund of A$500,000, and was raised to A$600,000 in 2010. With the co-sanctioning by the LPGA, the total purse was nearly doubled, and was also fixed in U.S. dollars. The purse was US$1.1 million in 2012, and increased again to its current level of US$1.2 million for 2013. Since 2011, the tournament's name has been the ISPS Handa Women's Australian Open.

The Australian Ladies Open was founded in 1974 as a 54-hole event, but folded after 1978.  It was resurrected in 1994 as the Women's Australian Open, this time as a 72-hole event.  Annika Sörenstam won that year, which was her first professional win.  It was also Karrie Webb's professional debut, and she would later win the event five times.  Starting in 2000, the Ladies European Tour began co-sanctioning the tournament. Following the 2004 event, sponsorship difficulties caused the tournament to stop once again, but after a two-year hiatus the tournament returned in 2007. The Women's Australian Open usually moves between various courses around Australia, except from 1995 through 2002 when it was held at the Yarra Yarra Golf Club in Melbourne.  The 2008 event was held at Kingston Heath Golf Club.

For several years after its return in 1994, the Women's Australian Open was played early in the ALPG schedule, usually in November.  Starting in 2000, it was changed to be played at the end of the schedule in February near the ANZ Ladies Masters, to allow both tournaments to be part of the Ladies European Tour.  Since the Women's Australian Open was played from 12 to 15 November 1998 during the 1998/1999 ALPG season, it was therefore not played during the 1999 calendar year.

The 2012 tournament was played at the Composite Course at Royal Melbourne, the championship course comprising 12 holes from the West course and six from the East course.  The Composite Course is considered one of the top courses in the world, and was used for the Presidents Cup competitions in 1998 and 2011. Through 2011, a women's professional competition had never been held on it; the 2012 Women's Australian Open was the first. The event was won by Jessica Korda after an historic six-player playoff, only the second in ALPG history. Korda holed a  birdie putt on the second playoff hole to claim her first LPGA Tour victory.

In 2013, the tournament moved to Royal Canberra Golf Club, and in 2014 to the Victoria Golf Club near Melbourne. In 2016 the event moved to Adelaide and was played there until 2020. In 2021, it was not played due to the COVID-19 pandemic.

In 2022, the tournament was played at Victoria Golf Club and Kingston Heath Golf Club. In a world-first for golf, the ISPS Handa Australian Open brought together the national men's and women's Open events, along with the All Abilities Championship. In 2022, the event fell during the LPGA's off-season and during the tour's final stage of qualifying school and therefore co-sanctioning the event with the LPGA was not possible.

Tournament names
1974: Wills Australian Ladies Open
1975–1978: Wills Qantas Australian Ladies Open
1994–1996:  Holden Women's Australian Open
1997:  Toyota Women's Australian Open
1998–2004:  AAMI Women's Australian Open
2007–20: MFS Women's Australian Open
2009: Women's Australian Open
2010: Handa Women's Australian Open
2011–present: ISPS Handa Women's Australian Open

2020 course layout
Royal Adelaide Golf Club

Source:

Winners

1Tournament shortened to 36 holes due to rain
POWon after playoff

Course record

See also
 Australian Women's Amateur
 Australian Girls' Amateur
 Australian Open

References

External links

Coverage on the LPGA Tour's official site
Coverage on the Ladies European Tour's official site
Coverage on the Ladies ALPG Tour's official site

Australian Open
Australian Open
Australian Open
Golf tournaments in Australia
International Sports Promotion Society
Recurring sporting events established in 1974
1974 establishments in Australia